Wilson Mutagaywa Kajumula Masiling (12 July 1956) is a Tanzanian politician and diplomat. He is Tanzania's Ambassador to the United States after having served as Ambassador to the Kingdom of the Netherlands from March 2013.

The Ambassador graduated from the University of Dar es Salaam Law School in 1983 and The George Washington University Law School where he obtained his Bachelor of Laws and Master of Laws Degrees in 1995.

Gallery

References

External links

1956 births
Living people
Ambassadors of Tanzania to the United States
Tanzanian MPs 2000–2005
Tanzanian MPs 2005–2010
University of Dar es Salaam alumni
George Washington University Law School alumni
Ambassadors of Tanzania to the Netherlands